Blackfriars Priory (formally the Priory of the Holy Spirit) is a Dominican religious community in Oxford, England. It houses two educational institutions: Blackfriars Studium, the centre of theological studies of the English Province of the Dominican Order (although it numbers members of other orders and lay people among its students and lecturers); and Blackfriars Hall, a constituent permanent private hall of the University of Oxford. The current prior of Blackfriars is Nicholas Crowe, and the regent of both the hall and the studium is John O'Connor. The name Blackfriars is commonly used in Britain to denote a house of Dominican friars, a reference to their black cappa, which forms part of their habit.

Blackfriars is located in central Oxford on St Giles', between the Ioannou Centre for Classical and Byzantine Studies and St Cross College.

History 

The Dominicans arrived in Oxford on 15 August 1221, at the instruction of a General Chapter meeting headed by Saint Dominic himself, little more than a week after the friar's death. As such, the hall is heir to the oldest tradition of teaching in Oxford, a tradition that precedes both the aularian houses that would characterise the next century and the collegiate houses that would characterise the rest of the University of Oxford's history. In 1236 they established a new and extensive priory in the St. Ebbes district.

Like all the monastic houses in Oxford, Blackfriars came into rapid and repeated conflict with the university authorities. With the Reformation, all monastic houses, including Blackfriars, were suppressed. The Dominicans did not return to Oxford for some 400 years, until 1921 when Blackfriars was refounded by Bede Jarrett as a religious house. The original priory building was designed by Edward Doran Webb and completed in 1929. The Dominican studium at Blackfriars had a close relationship with the university, culminating in the establishment of Blackfriars as a permanent private hall in 1994.

Blackfriars' Studium 
Blackfriars offers those preparing for the Catholic priesthood the Baccalaureate in Sacred Theology (STB) granted by the Pontifical University of Saint Thomas Aquinas, Angelicum in Rome.  It is also possible for lay men and women to begin the Angelicum's STB programme by studying in the Blackfriars Studium and to conclude the programme with at least a year's full-time study at the Angelicum.

Blackfriars Hall
Blackfriars Hall is a permanent private hall, meaning that it is owned and governed by an outside institution (in this case, the English Province of the Order of Preachers) and not by its fellows. Blackfriars Hall is a centre for the study of theology and philosophy informed by the intellectual tradition of St Thomas Aquinas. It admits men and women of any faith for Oxford undergraduate degrees in theology schools, PPE and for a wide range of postgraduate degrees.

Blackfriars Hall is the home of a number of other institutes including, the Las Casas Institute on ethics, governance and social justice. Launched in November 2008, the institute contributes to the hall's founding vision to be a centre of the social as well as the sacred sciences. Its founding director (from October 2008 to January 2011) was Francis Davis;  the director is Richard Finn.

The Aquinas Institute was established in 2004 under the directorship of Fergus Kerr. It aims to foster study of St Thomas at Oxford through seminars, conferences, summer schools and programmes. Patrons of the institute include John Haldane, Alasdair MacIntyre and Eleonore Stump.

People associated with Blackfriars

Notable former students

 Joseph William Tobin, C.Ss.R., Cardinal prelate and Archbishop of the Roman Catholic Archdiocese of Newark
 Anthony Fisher , 9th Roman Catholic Archbishop of Sydney
 James Alison, theologian and author
 Delia Gallagher, journalist, CNN Faith and Values Correspondent
 Herbert McCabe, theologian and philosopher 
 Malcolm McMahon, Archbishop of Liverpool
 Aidan Nichols, first John Paul II Memorial Visiting Lecturer at the University of Oxford

Fellows and academics

 John Battle - former MP for Leeds West
 Brian Davies - philosopher and former Regent
 Richard Finn - former Regent and Novice Master for The English Province of The Order of Preachers  
 Andrew Linzey - theologian, author, and prominent figure in the Christian vegetarian movement
 Timothy Radcliffe - Master of the Order of Preachers from 1992 to 2001
 Benjamin Earl - Procurator General of the Order of Preachers
 Fergus Kerr - Regent (1998-2004)  
 James MacMillan - classical composer and conductor, Honorary Fellow 
 John Saward - fellow of Greyfriars and associate lecturer at Blackfriars 
 Roger Scruton - philosopher who specialised in aesthetics
 John Loughlin - Emeritus Fellow of St Edmund's College, Cambridge

Burials at Blackfriars Abbey, Oxford
Robert Bacon (writer)
Richard Fishacre

References

External links
 Blackfriars Priory website
 Blackfriars Hall website

 
1221 establishments in England
Educational institutions established in the 13th century
Educational institutions established in 1921
Permanent private halls of the University of Oxford
Buildings and structures of the University of Oxford
Oxford
Oxford